Eupithecia macrodisca is a moth in the family Geometridae that is endemic to Thailand.

The forewings are blackish grey and the hindwings paler whitish grey with an ochreous tinge.

References

External links

Moths described in 2009
Endemic fauna of Thailand
Moths of Asia
macrodisca